The Greater Malé Connectivity Project is a project that aims to link the islands of Malé, Villingli, Gulhifalhu and Thilafushi in the Maldives. This project has been said to be " the largest-ever infrastructure project in the Maldives." Once completed the total length of the bridge would be 6.74 km and it would be divided between the islands of Malé-Villingli, Villingli-Gulhifalhu and Gulhifalu-Thilafushi. Before this, the largest connectivity project in the Maldives was the 1.4 km Chinese-funded bridge connecting Malé to the Maldives airport in Hulhule island, and to the Hulumalhe island.

The project is the result of bilateral consultation between India and the Maldives and has been under discussion since the visit of India's External Affairs Minister to Malé in September 2019.

Need for the bridge 
Malé is the capital of Maldives and nearly 40% of its population lives on the Malé island of 8.30 square kilometer. According to University of Pennsylvania, Malé is one of the most densely populated cities globally. Malé has often been described as an overcrowded island which has little expanse for the city to expand.

This pushed the current government in the Maldives to consider decentralization. And the growth of other inhabited islands by furnishing them with civic amenities like hospitals and other institutions and incentivizing people to relocate to other islands, reducing the burden of Malé. With this bridge, connectivity and transportation to the capital city would also improve, opening up an alternative transport route, which has been a persistent problem for the country's people.

Construction plans 
The plan for construction propose the construction of three navigation bridges of 140 m main span across the deep channel between each island, 1.41 km of marine viaduct in deep water, 2.32 km marine viaduct in shallow water or on land, and 2.96 km of at-grade roads.

While the land interchanges at Malé and Villingili will be signalised junctions, the ones at the Gulhifalhu and Thilafushi will be roundabouts.

Finances 
Following a five-year grace period, the interest rate is 1.75% and the Maldives has to return it through a 20-year time. In the $500 million, $100 million is on grant, while $400 million is on Line of Credit by the EXIM Bank.

Chinese Debt-Trap Allegations 
When the deal was first declared, former President of Maldives Mohamed Nasheed, had referred to China's debt-trap loans to the former Yameen administration in a tweet: "The super low cost development assistance announced by @DrSJaishankar today is exactly what Maldives needs. Real help from a friend, to help us develop critical infrastructure. Rather than eye-wateringly costly financial loans that leaves the country mired in debt. @PMOIndia."

There is also a conflict about the amount of debt Maldives owes to China. Nasheed states that the island nation has $3.4 billion debt to China, meanwhile the Chinese ambassador to the country says that it is just $1.4 billion. Either of them are a huge sum of money for a country whose yearly GDP is only $4.9 billion.

See also 

 India-Maldives relations
 AFCONS

References

Maldive Islands

Bridges in the Maldives
Bridges under construction
India–Maldives relations